David Terrier (born 4 August 1973 in Verdun, Meuse) is a retired French football defender who last played for US Créteil.

Club career
He played for FC Metz and AC Ajaccio in Ligue 1. Terrier also played in the Premier League for West Ham United. He made only one appearance, on 9 August 1997, coming on as a substitute for Paul Kitson in a 2-1 away win against Barnsley.

Honours
 Coupe de la Ligue champion in 1996 with FC Metz
 Ligue 2 champion in 2002 with AC Ajaccio

References

External links
 Profile - FC Metz

1973 births
Living people
People from Verdun
French footballers
FC Metz players
West Ham United F.C. players
Newcastle United F.C. players
OGC Nice players
AC Ajaccio players
US Créteil-Lusitanos players
Premier League players
Ligue 1 players
Expatriate footballers in England
French expatriate footballers
Association football defenders
Sportspeople from Meuse (department)
Footballers from Grand Est
French expatriate sportspeople in England